Per Bach Laursen was seeking a second term, after winning the mayor's position following the election in 2017.

In this election, Venstre would win 9 seats, and would increased their vote share by 7.2%, The Conservatives, who had held the mayor's position from 2014 to 2017, decreased their vote share by 2.0%. As the traditional blue bloc now had 18 of the 27 seats, Venstre
was in pole position to secure the mayor's position. Following the election night, a constitution
was agreed upon, that would see Per Bach Laursen as mayor for a second term.

Electoral system
For elections to Danish municipalities, a number varying from 9 to 31 are chosen to be elected to the municipal council. The seats are then allocated using the D'Hondt method and a closed list proportional representation.
Vesthimmerland Municipality had 27 seats in 2021

Unlike in Danish General Elections, in elections to municipal councils, electoral alliances are allowed.

Electoral alliances  

Electoral Alliance 1

Electoral Alliance 2

Electoral Alliance 3

Results

References 

Vesthimmerland